The Tallulah Coca-Cola Bottling Plant in Tallulah, Louisiana, was listed on the National Register of Historic Places on January 23, 2013.

The building was a Coca-Cola bottling plant until 1962, when it was converted to use as a Coca-Cola distribution warehouse.  The facility was operated by Joe Biedenharn, "the first person to bottle Coca-Cola."

The plant is a brick industrial building built on a poured concrete foundation in  about 1930 and expanded, almost doubling its size, in about 1940. A partial second story at the front is supported by steel columns.  The building has a Classical Revival front facade.

See also
National Register of Historic Places listings in Madison Parish, Louisiana

References

National Register of Historic Places in Louisiana
Neoclassical architecture in Louisiana
Buildings and structures completed in 1930
Madison Parish, Louisiana
Coca-Cola buildings and structures